The 2022 Monmouth Hawks football team represented the Monmouth University during the 2022 NCAA Division I FCS football season. The Hawks played their home games at the Kessler Stadium in West Long Branch, New Jersey. The team was coached by 30th-year head coach Kevin Callahan.

Previous season

The Hawks finished the 2021 season with a record of 7–1, 6–1 in Big South play, finishing in a second place. This was Monmouth's final season as a member of the Big South Conference. The Hawks will be joining the Colonial Athletic Association (CAA) for all sports starting in 2022–23.

Schedule

Game summaries

at New Hampshire

Fordham

Georgetown

at No. 9 Villanova

at Lehigh

Albany

at Maine

No. 22 Rhode Island

Towson

at No. 18 Delaware

Stony Brook

References

Monmouth Hawks
Monmouth Hawks football seasons
Monmouth Hawks football